The Enhanced Fujita scale (abbreviated as EF-Scale) rates tornado intensity based on the severity of the damage they cause. It is used in some countries, including the United States, Canada, China, and Mongolia.

The Enhanced Fujita scale replaced the decommissioned Fujita scale that was introduced in 1971 by Ted Fujita. Operational use began in the United States on February 1, 2007, followed by Canada on April 1, 2013. It has also been proposed for use in France. The scale has the same basic design as the original Fujita scale—six intensity categories from zero to five, representing increasing degrees of damage. It was revised to reflect better examinations of tornado damage surveys, in order to align wind speeds more closely with associated storm damage.  Better standardizing and elucidating what was previously subjective and ambiguous, it also adds more types of structures and vegetation, expands degrees of damage, and better accounts for variables such as differences in construction quality. An "EF-Unknown" (EFU) category was later added for tornadoes that cannot be rated due to a lack of damage evidence.

The newer scale was publicly unveiled by the National Weather Service at a conference of the American Meteorological Society in Atlanta on February 2, 2006. It was developed from 2000 to 2004 by the Fujita Scale Enhancement Project of the Wind Science and Engineering Research Center at Texas Tech University, which brought together dozens of expert meteorologists and civil engineers in addition to its own resources.

As with the Fujita scale, the Enhanced Fujita scale remains a damage scale and only a proxy for actual wind speeds. While the wind speeds associated with the damage listed have not undergone empirical analysis (such as detailed physical or any numerical modeling) owing to excessive cost, the wind speeds were obtained through a process of expert elicitation based on various engineering studies since the 1970s as well as from the field experience of meteorologists and engineers. In addition to damage to structures and vegetation, radar data, photogrammetry, and cycloidal marks (ground swirl patterns) may be utilized when available.

The scale was used for the first time in the United States a year after its public announcement when parts of central Florida were struck by multiple tornadoes, the strongest of which were rated at EF3 on the new scale. It was used for the first time in Canada shortly after its implementation there when a tornado developed near the town of Shelburne, Ontario, on April 18, 2013, causing up to EF1 damage.

Parameters
The seven categories for the EF scale are listed below, in order of increasing intensity. Although the wind speeds and photographic damage examples have been updated, the damage descriptions given are based on those from the Fujita scale, which are more or less still accurate. However, for the actual EF scale in practice, damage indicators (the type of structure which has been damaged) are predominantly used in determining the tornado intensity.

Damage indicators and degrees of damage
The EF scale currently has 28 damage indicators (DI), or types of structures and vegetation, each with a varying number of degrees of damage (DoD). Each structure has a maximum DoD value, which is given by total destruction. Lesser damage to a structure will yield lower DoD values. The links in the right column of the following table describe the degrees of damage for the damage indicators listed in each row.

Differences from the Fujita scale
The new scale takes into account the quality of construction and standardizes different kinds of structures. The wind speeds on the original scale were deemed by meteorologists and engineers as being too high, and engineering studies indicated that slower winds than initially estimated cause the respective degrees of damage. None of the tornadoes in the United States recorded before February 1, 2007, will be re-categorized.

Essentially, there is no functional difference in how tornadoes are rated. The old ratings and new ratings are smoothly connected with a linear formula. The only differences are adjusted wind speeds, measurements of which were not used in previous ratings, and refined damage descriptions; this is to standardize ratings and to make it easier to rate tornadoes which strike few structures. Twenty-eight Damage Indicators (DI), with descriptions such as "double-wide mobile home" or "strip mall", are used along with Degrees of Damage (DoD) to determine wind estimates. Different structures, depending on their building materials and ability to survive high winds, have their own DIs and DoDs. Damage descriptors and wind speeds will also be readily updated as new information is learned. Some differences do exist between the two scales in the ratings assigned to damage. An EF5 rating on the new scale requires a higher standard of construction in houses than does an F5 rating on the old scale. So, the complete destruction and sweeping away of a typical American frame home, which would likely be rated F5 on the Fujita scale, would be rated EF4 or lower on the Enhanced Fujita scale.

Since the new system still uses actual tornado damage and similar degrees of damage for each category to estimate the storm's wind speed, the National Weather Service states that the new scale will likely not lead to an increase in the number of tornadoes classified as EF5. Additionally, the upper bound of the wind speed range for EF5 is open—in other words, there is no maximum wind speed designated.

Rating classifications

For purposes such as tornado climatology studies, Enhanced Fujita scale ratings may be grouped into classes. Classifications are also used by NOAA's Storm Prediction Center to determine whether the tornado was "significant". This same classification is also used by the National Weather Service.

The table shows other variations of the tornado rating classifications based on certain areas.

See also

 Beaufort scale
 International Fujita scale
 Saffir–Simpson hurricane wind scale
 Severe weather terminology (United States)
 TORRO scale
 Tornado intensity and damage
 Wind engineering
 Lists of tornadoes and tornado outbreaks
 List of F4 and EF4 tornadoes
 List of F5 and EF5 tornadoes

References

External links

 National Oceanic and Atmospheric Administration
 NOAA National Weather Service Improves Tornado Rating System at NOAA News
The Enhanced Fujita Scale (EF Scale) at Storm Prediction Center
 EF-Scale Training  at The Warning Decision Training Branch of National Weather Service (NWS)
 The Enhanced Fujita Tornado Scale at National Climatic Data Center
 The Tornado: An Engineering-Oriented Perspective (NWS SR147)
 A Guide for Conducting Convective Windstorm Surveys (NWS SR146)
 Fujita Scale Enhancement Project (Wind Science and Engineering Research Center at Texas Tech University)
 Symposium on the F-Scale and Severe-Weather Damage Assessment at American Meteorological Society
 A Guide to F-Scale Damage Assessment, MetEd, University Corporation for Atmospheric Research
 Mitigation Assessment Team Report: Midwest Tornadoes of May 3, 1999 (Federal Emergency Management Agency)

Hazard scales
Wind
Tornado
Scales in meteorology